Palaearctonyx ("ancient bear's claw") is an extinct genus of omnivorous placental mammals from clade Carnivoraformes, that lived in North America from early to middle Eocene.

Classification and phylogeny

Classification
Palaearctonyx was named by Matthew in 1909 and it was assigned to family Miacidae. Later, it was assigned to Caniformia by Flynn and Galiano in 1982, and than back to Miacidae by Flynn in 1998. From 2010 and later, this genus was assigned to clade Carnivoraformes.

Phylogeny
The phylogenetic relationships of genus Palaearctonyx are shown in the following cladogram:

See also
 Mammal classification
 Carnivoraformes
 Miacidae

References

†
Eocene mammals of North America
Miacids
Prehistoric placental genera